Anne Marie Tremko (born February 28, 1968) is an American actress best known for her role as Leslie Burke on Saved by the Bell: The College Years.  Her most recent role was a guest appearance on a 2003 episode of Judging Amy.

Filmography 

 The Adventures of Brisco County, Jr. (1993) (TV episode as Amanda Wickwire)
 Saved by the Bell: The College Years (19 episodes, 1993-1994 as Leslie Burke) (TV series)
 My Antonia (1995) (TV episode as Lena Lingard)
 The Computer Wore Tennis Shoes (1995) (TV episode as Sarah Matthews)
 Wings (Boys Just Wanna Have Fun (1995) TV episode as Jessica
 Sisters (A Perfectly Reasonable Explanation (1995) TV episode as Melissa Sorenson)
 Malibu Shores as Megan (2 episodes, 1996)
 True Women (1997) (TV as Matilda Lockhart)
 Uncle Sam (1997) (Movie) as Louise Harper
 The Member of the Wedding (1997) (TV film) as Janice
 Nick Freno: Licensed Teacher as Thea (TV episode, 1998
 Chicago Hope as Laura Turner (TV episode, 1998 Guest Star)
 L.A. Doctors as Sally Crowell (TV episode, 1998 Guest Star)
 The District as Mrs. Howell (TV episode, 2002 Guest Star)
 Judging Amy as Susan Ordonez (TV episode, 2003 Guest Star)

External links 

 

1968 births
American film actresses
American television actresses
Living people
People from Urbana, Illinois
21st-century American women